Shinobido 2: Revenge of Zen, known in Japan as , is a video game published by Spike in Japan in 2011 and Namco Bandai Games in North America and the PAL region in 2012. It was developed by Acquire, authors of the Tenchu and Way of the Samurai series, as a sequel to Shinobido: Way of the Ninja and Shinobido: Tales of the Ninja. A downloadable content pack, Mirror Spirits, was released on May 9, 2012. The game, along with its DLC, was removed from the PSN Store in 2016, most likely due to the license expiring from Bandai Namco in North America and the PAL region.

Gameplay

Players take the role of one of the two main characters, Zen and Kaede. The main town features various menus. Some allow players to equip ninja tools such as caltrops, mines, shurikens, potions, smoke bombs, etc., while others let them accept missions from the three primary daimyou. As they progress through the story, players have the choice of which daimyou they want to help, and they are encouraged to only help that daimyou, encouraging three separate playthroughs. The daimyou issue various missions such as assassinating a certain target, protecting a shipping crate with supplies, freeing captive peasants, or stealing resources. Once a mission is selected, players are dropped into a map filled with enemies and treasures to collect. They must utilize stealth and a variety of skills such as a grapple hook, silent assassinations, counter attacks, etc., in order to complete their objective. Once they level up, they can put attribute points into max health, attack, defense, an extended special attack meter that allows for the Zankoku attack (a teleporting silent kill), and a longer grapple hook. Along the way, players will encounter various bosses, such as enemy ninja clan leaders, and eventually the other daimyou themselves. Players can utilize items to weaken their foes or try to lure them into a silent kill, allowing for a wide variety of play-styles.

Plot

Set six months after the events of the previous game, Shinobido 2 sees the once peaceful region of Utakata in the grip of a vicious civil war. Players step into the shoes of Zen, betrayed by his companions and left fatally wounded. San, the love of his life, was killed by his two childhood friends, Shu and Nagi.

Reception

The game received "mixed" reviews according to the review aggregation website Metacritic. In Japan, Famitsu gave it a score of three eights and one seven for a total of 31 out of 40.

PlayStation LifeStyle's overall positive review noted its cult appeal as the reviewer had plenty of praise, calling it "a fun stealth game with tons of depth."

References

External links
Official website
Official website  

2011 video games
Bandai Namco games
Video games about ninja
PlayStation Vita games
PlayStation Vita-only games
Stealth video games
Sony Interactive Entertainment games
Video game sequels
Video games developed in Japan
Video games set in the 16th century
Video games featuring female protagonists
Acquire (company) games
Single-player video games